This is a list of bidding systems used in contract bridge. Systems listed have either had an historical impact on the development of bidding in the game or have been or are currently being used at the national or international levels of competition. 

Bidding systems are characterized as belonging to one of two broadly defined categories:
 natural bidding systems and
 artificial bidding systems.

Nevertheless, each contains elements of the other given the number and variety of treatments and conventions that have been developed by bridge bidding theorists.

Natural four card majors systems
 5-4-4-3 System
 Acol
 Baron, an English system developed in the 1940s by Leo Baron, Adam Meredith and others.
 CAB, acronym for Two Clubs, Ace-asking and Blackwood
 Canapé
 Colonial Acol
 Culbertson
 EFOS, the Economical Forcing System developed by Eric Jannersten and others in Sweden in the sixties and seventies
 EHAA, acronym for Every Hand An Adventure
 Four Aces Team
 Goren
 Nordic
 Official System
 Reith One-over-one

Natural five card majors systems
 2/1 game forcing
 5-5-4-2 System
 5-5-5-1 System
 Aces Scientific
 Alpha
 Bridge World Standard
 Eastern Scientific
 Five Card Majors
 Majeure Cinquième
 Romex
 Roth–Stone
 Kaplan–Sheinwold
 Standard American
 Western Scientific

Strong club systems
 Blue Club
 Black Club
 Canary Club
 Carrot Club
 French Club
 Hybrid Club
 Icelandic Precision
 Modified Italian Canape System (MICS), constructed and published by Ken Rexford
 Moscito
 Neapolitan Club
 Nottingham Club
 Power Precision Club
 Precision Club
 Schenken Big Club
 Simplified Precision
 Super Precision Club
 Ultimate Club
 Vanderbilt Club

Artificial one club systems
 Betangina
 Bissell
 Lea System
 Little Roman Club
 Polish Club
 Power Club
 Roman Club
 Swedish Club
 Trefle Squeeze
 Vienna

Strong diamond systems
 Big Diamond
 Magic Diamond
 Leghorn Diamond (Livorno)
 Mirror Diamond
 CS System

Weak opening systems
 Carrotti
 Delta
 No Name
 Regres
 Säffle Spade, a forcing Pass system

Artificial systems
 HUM Systems
 Little Major
 Marmic
 Relay Systems

Losing trick count systems 
 Imperspicuity

Other systems
 Amsterdam Club
 Bangkok Club
 Churchill Style
 Crane
 Dutch Spade
 Kamikaze Notrump
 Monaco
 New South Wales
 Orange Club
 Pro System
 Simplified Club
 Sims
 Stone Age Acol With Pakistani Preempts
 Symmetric Relay
 Ultimate Club
 Walsh
 Winslow
  Cliff Yang
 MMMMajor Bridge Bidding System

References